Evan Comerford may refer to:

 Evan Comerford (Tipperary Gaelic footballer) (born 1994)
 Evan Comerford (Dublin Gaelic footballer) (born 1998)